Giovanni Battista Cimaroli (1687–1771) was an Italian painter of rustic landscapes with farms, villas and graceful figures  and capricci of ruins and views of towns in the Veneto.

Biography
He was born in Salò on Lake Garda, not far from Brescia. He studied under Antonio Aureggio and later in Bologna with the landscape painter Antonio Calza, before moving to Venice around 1713. Cimaroli's rustic landscapes are reminiscent of the Arcadian scenes of Francesco Zuccarelli, influenced by a tradition of Lombardian realism.

Cimaroli collaborated c. 1722–6, with Canaletto (amongst other Venetian painters) on Owen McSwiney's unusual Allegorical Tombs series, whose aim was to memorialize British worthies, the main sponsor being the 2nd Duke of Richmond. Caneletto's vedute became the inspiration for Cimaroli's own topographical views of Venice, which until recently have often been concealed under misattributions to Canaletto. 

Important early patrons of Cimaroli were Marshal Schulenberg, Count Tessin of Sweden, and the British merchant and diplomat settled in Venice, Joseph (Consul) Smith. It was through the disposition of Consul Smith's art collection, hand-picked by Smith for King George III, that six landscapes by Cimaroli entered the Royal Collection, of which three oval views survive. Cimaroli, despite the esteem of contemporaries, was nearly forgotten until the mid-twentieth century, but has undergone a revival of critical interest, typified by the publication of the first catalogue raisonné of his paintings.

Notes

References

Haskell, Francis (1980). Patrons and Painters: A Study of the Relations between Italian Art and Society in the Age of the Baroque.  Revised and Enlarged edition.  Yale University Press.  New Haven and London.

Spadotto, Federica (2009). "Zuccarelli tra emuli, imitatori e copisti", p. 324–7. In L'impegno e la conoscenza: studi di storia dell'arte in onore di Egido Martina. Pedrocco, Filippo and Alberto Craievich, eds. Verona: Scripta edizioni.

External links

Gio: Batista Cimaroli Abecedario Pittorico del m.r.p. Pellegrino, Antonio Orlandi; and Pietro Guarienti. Venezia, 1753.
Giovanni Battista Cimaroli, 3 works, Royal Collection, e-gallery.
Italian Paintings in the Robert Lehman Collection, a collection catalog containing information about the artist and his works (see p. 256, plate 103 on following page).

1687 births
1771 deaths
18th-century Italian painters
Italian male painters
Painters from Brescia
18th-century Italian male artists